Ivo Lapenna (5 November 1909 in Split  15 December 1987 in Copenhagen) was a Yugoslav-Dalmatian Italian law professor.

Lapenna was a noted Esperanto speaker and served as the President of the World Esperanto Association between 1964 and 1974. Lapenna was highly regarded as an orator in Esperanto, authored a number of books, and was the driving force behind the 1954 Montevideo Resolution in which UNESCO recognized Esperanto.


Works

See also
President of the Universal Esperanto Association

References

External links

Ivo Lapenna Foundation
 Promoter of the international language (Esperanto)

1909 births
1987 deaths
Yugoslav Esperantists
Presidents of the Universal Esperanto Association
Writers from Split, Croatia